Chen Yudong (born 28 September 2004) is a Chinese figure skater. He is the 2020 Cup of China bronze medalist, the 2020 Chinese junior national champion, and the 2022 Chinese national champion.

Career

Junior career

2018-19 season: First Junior Worlds 
Chen was sent to train with Rafael Arutyunyan in the 2018-19 season. He was assigned to the  2019 Junior World Championships where he finished in 25th place after the short program and did not advance to the free skate.

2019-20 season: Junior Grand Prix debut 
Chen debuted in the Junior Grand Prix circuit and was assigned to the Courchevel and Egna/Neumkart, where he finished in 9th and 6th place, respectively. He was assigned to compete at the 2020 Winter Youth Olympics in Lausanne, where he finished in 6th place.

Senior career

2020-21 season: Senior debut 
With the 2020–21 figure skating season having to deal with the COVID-19 pandemic, senior skaters were invited to a maximum of one Grand Prix event, based largely on geographic location.   Chen was invited to the 2020 Cup of China, where he finished in third place behind Jin Boyang and  Yan Han.

2021-22 season: Senior international debut 
Chen was assigned to the 2021 Cup of China as his Grand Prix event of the season. After the 2021 Cup of China was cancelled, he was reassigned to its replacement event, the 2021 Gran Premio d'Italia, where he finished in 10th place.

2022-23 season 
Chen, still being age-eligible for the junior grand prix circuit, was assigned to the Solidarity Cup 2022, where he finished in 2nd place, winning his first junior grand prix medal.
Chen was assigned to compete in the junior and senior levels in the 2022 Asian Open Figure Skating Trophy. He finished first at both levels. Having met the minimum technical score requirements, Chen was entered to compete at the 2023 Four Continents Figure Skating Championships. After winning the 2022 Chinese Figure Skating Championships, he competed at the 2023 Four Continents Championships, where he finished 15th with a score of 184.41. At the 2023 World Junior Championships, he placed 14th after the short program, but had a strong free skate, finishing 5th for the segment and 8th overall.

Programs

Competitive highlights 
GP: Grand Prix; JGP: Junior Grand Prix

Detailed results 
ISU Personal best highlighted in bold.

Senior results

Junior results

Advanced novice results

References

External links 
 

2004 births
Living people
Chinese male single skaters
Figure skaters from Heilongjiang
Figure skaters at the 2020 Winter Youth Olympics
Sportspeople from Qiqihar